Mannathi Mannan is a 1960 Indian Tamil-language swashbuckler film directed and produced by M. Natesan. The film stars M. G. Ramachandran, Anjali Devi and Padmini. It was released on 19 October 1960, during Diwali.

Plot 

Dancer Chitra and prince of Uraiyur Manivannan fall in love with each other after meeting in a dance competition. However, Chola King Kanikannan also desires Chitra. Meanwhile, Manivannan's father, the Cheran King sends his minister, seeking the hand of Karpagavalli, daughter of King Karigala, for his son. But the King thwarts this proposal, talking ill of the heredity of Manivannan's mother. Unable to bear his mother being insulted, Manivannan goes to the Chola kingdom and abducts Karpagavalli. In the meantime, a dacoit, played very cleverly by Kanikannan, forces Manivannan to marry Karpagavalli.

Cast 
Cast according to the opening credits of the film

Male Cast
 M. G. R. as Manivannan
 P. S. Veerappa as Kanikannan
 M. G. Chakrapani as Karikala Chozhan
 Kula Deivam V. R. Rajagopal as Balaraman
 N. S. Narayana Pillai
 Azhwar Kuppusami
 P. S. Venkatachalam
 R. M. Sethupathi
 Thirupathisami
 T. V. Sivanantham

Female Cast
 Anjali as Karpagavalli
 Padmini as Chithra
 Ragini
 G. Sakunthala as Mangayarkarasi
 Lakshmiprabha
Dance
 Lakshmi Rajyam, Rita, T. S. Jayanthi,T. S. Kamala, D. Madhuri, T. K. Rajeswari,Revathi, Sakunthala, C. R. Mohana, G. Bala,G. Sundari, Leela, N. Meera, B. Shantha,K. Rajeswari, Rajamma, Vittoba, J. N. Rajam,G. Kamala, Nagu and P. T. Saroja.

Soundtrack 
The music composed by Viswanathan–Ramamoorthy, with lyrics by Kannadasan and A. Maruthakasi.  The song "Aadatha Manamum" is based on Latangi raga.

Release and reception 
Mannathi Mannan was released on 19 October 1960, during Diwali. It was previously scheduled for 30 September. The Indian Express wrote "the story could have been very well developed in a different way [..] Anyway the picture is replete with romance, dance and fight" and praised the performances of star cast including Padmini. Kanthan of Kalki called it a very ordinary film, but good by Ramachandran standards. Despite facing competition from Kairasi, Petra Manam, and Paavai Vilakku, released on the same day, the film became a commercial success. Historian Randor Guy wrote the film "achieve cult status and remembered for the melodious music, meaningful lyrics and dialogue, the dances by Padmini, Ragini and Anjali Devi and the impressive performance by MGR, and the opening song, 'Acchham Enbathu' helped MGR become a cultural icon".

References

External links 
 

1960 films
1960s Tamil-language films
Films scored by Viswanathan–Ramamoorthy
Indian swashbuckler films